Feadillo principensis is an endemic species of armadillo woodlice, a land crustacean isopods of the family Armadillidae that lives in the island of Príncipe in São Tomé and Príncipe. The species was described in 1983 by Helmut Schmalfuss and Franco Ferrara.

See also

Feadillo saotomensis - an isopod native to the island of São Tomé

References

Further reading

 Schmalfuss, H. 2003. World catalog of terrestrial isopods (Isopoda: Oniscidea). Stuttgarter Beiträge zur Naturkunde, Serie A Nr. 654: 341 pp.

Woodlice
Endemic fauna of Príncipe
Invertebrates of São Tomé and Príncipe
Taxa named by Franco Ferrara (botanist)
Crustaceans described in 1983